Guo Jia (born 24 September 1980 in Xiangtan, Hunan) is a Chinese softball player who competed at the 2004 Summer Olympics. In the 2004 Olympic softball competition she was a member of the Chinese team which finished fourth. Guo was a member of Team China at the 2008 Summer Olympics in Beijing.

External links
Profile at 2008teamchina.olympic.cn

References

1980 births
Living people
Olympic softball players of China
People from Xiangtan
Softball players at the 2004 Summer Olympics
Softball players at the 2008 Summer Olympics
Chinese softball players
Sportspeople from Hunan
Asian Games medalists in softball
Softball players at the 2010 Asian Games
Softball players at the 2014 Asian Games
Asian Games silver medalists for China
Asian Games bronze medalists for China
Medalists at the 2010 Asian Games
Medalists at the 2014 Asian Games
21st-century Chinese women